Rashida (رشيدة) is a feminine Arabic given name. Notable people with the name include:
Rashida (Chinese politician), one of the first group of women elected to parliament in China
Rashida al-Qaili, Yemeni journalist
Rashida Beal (born 1994), American soccer player
Rashida Bee, Indian activist
Rashida Bumbray, American curator, choreographer, author, visual and performing arts critic
Rashida Gonzalez Robinson (born 1980), American DJ
Rashida Haque Choudhury (1926–?), Indian politician
Rashida Jolley, American harpist
Rashida Jones (born 1976), American actress
Rashida Jones (television executive), president of cable news network MSNBC (born 1980/1981)
Rashida Khanum, Pakistani politician
Rashida Manjoo, South African professor and activist
Rashida Riffat, Pakistani politician
Rashida Strober, American playwright and activist
Rashida Tlaib (born 1976), American politician
Rashida Yousuf, Maldivian politician and diplomat
Rashida Bello, Nigerian politician and Wife of Kogi State Governor

Arabic feminine given names